Elections to High Peak Borough Council in Derbyshire, England, the United Kingdom were held on 7 May 1979. All of the council was up for election and control of the council changed from Conservative control to no overall control.

Boundary changes since the 1976 local elections reduced the number of seats by 2.

After the election, the composition of the council was:
Conservative 22
Labour 12
Liberal 2
Independent 8

Election result

Ward results

References

1979
High Peak
1970s in Derbyshire